The video game industry is a young industry in Ghana, and has been developing in the country since the early 1980s. Leti Arts is one of the emerging video game companies in Africa.

In August 2016, Ghana's Gaming Commission, which regulates gambling within the country, stated that it does not regulate video games as long as no bets are placed on players.

Organizations such as Gamer TV, Madagastar Esports, AnTrix Gaming, GameNerd, Giiks Gaming City and GasBros Gaming Network are pioneers in the industry. Video gaming and gamers have been the rise for the last decade. Primarily tournaments are used to bring gamers around to associate and expand the gaming space. Events like the Annual Global Game Jam have greatly helped in the establishment of gaming as a career choice. Organisations like Virtual Union and Gamers' Republic are pushing for pro gamers and associations like the Ghana E-sports Association are pushing to usher in a new era for E-sports in Ghana. Tournaments are also held in major cities like Accra and Kumasi. Video Gaming and eSports in general is slowly been accepted and integrated into the Ghanaian culture.

Video Game Development

Game developers of Ghana

 Leti Arts

Misc games

 Twin Drums (Remote studio based in Berlin, Accra, & North America. Online games.)

References

Ghanaian culture